Foros (formerly named Fobos from 1983 to 2014) is a Latvian icebreaking salvage tug. She was built at Wärtsilä Helsinki Shipyard, Finland, and delivered in 1983.

References 

Ships of Latvia
Icebreakers of Latvia
1983 ships
Ships built in Helsinki